is a former Japanese football player.

Club statistics

References

External links

1988 births
Living people
Association football people from Kanagawa Prefecture
Japanese footballers
J1 League players
J2 League players
J3 League players
Japan Football League players
Shonan Bellmare players
SP Kyoto FC players
Fukushima United FC players
Association football midfielders